Colacu may refer to several villages in Romania:

 Colacu, a village in the town of Răcari, Dâmboviţa County
 Colacu, a village in Fundu Moldovei Commune, Suceava County
 Colacu, a village in Valea Sării Commune, Vrancea County